Coghlan's Guides were a series of travel guide books to Europe written by Francis Coghlan in the mid-19th century.

List of Coghlan's Guides by date of publication

1820s
 A Guide to France, or, Travellers their own commissioners: shewing the cheapest and most expeditious system of travelling ... Illustrated with an engraved plan of Calais, etc. J. Onwhyn: London, 1828

1830s-1840s
 
 
 
 
 
 
  + Indexes

1850s-1860s
 
  + Index
 
  + Contents
 
 
 
  + Index

List of Coghlan's Guides by geographic coverage

Belgium
 
 
  + Index

France
 
 
  + Index

Germany
  + Index
  + Contents

Great Britain
 
 Coast Companion to Rye-Winchelsea-Hastings-St. Leonards-East-Bourne-Brighton-Worthing-and Bognor. London : H. Hughes, [1830?]
 
 
 
 
 
 
  + Contents
 
 
 
 
 
  +  Index

Italy
 
 
  + Index

Netherlands

Russia

Switzerland
 
  + Index

See also
 Charles Francis Coghlan, thespian son of Coghlan

References

External links
 WorldCat. Francis Coghlan
 Ancestry.com. Coghlan family

Travel guide books
Series of books
Publications established in the 1820s
Tourism in Europe